Wojciech Jankowski (born 1 April 1963 in Płock) is a Polish rower.

In 2009, he was awarded the Knight's Cross of the Order of Polonia Restituta for outstanding contributions to the development of sport, for achievements in training and coaching as well as outstanding sporting achievements.

References 
 
 

1963 births
Living people
Polish male rowers
Rowers at the 1988 Summer Olympics
Rowers at the 1992 Summer Olympics
Rowers at the 1996 Summer Olympics
Olympic bronze medalists for Poland
Olympic rowers of Poland
Knights of the Order of Polonia Restituta
Olympic medalists in rowing
Sportspeople from Płock
World Rowing Championships medalists for Poland
Medalists at the 1992 Summer Olympics